The kar is a vocal genre in Ottoman classical music. It was a movement of the fasıl, or suite.

References

External links
Kar page
Kar page

Turkish music
Turkish words and phrases